"Now What?" is the first episode of the seventh season of the American medical drama series House. It first aired on September 20, 2010, on Fox.

Plot
In the aftermath of last season's finale in which House and Cuddy admitted they had feelings for each other, the seventh season opener finds the two exploring the ramifications of those feelings and attempting to make a real relationship work. Wilson who is worried about House since he did not show up to work goes to House's apartment, knocks on the door and calls his cell. Cuddy tells him to let him in but House says no, and Wilson eventually leaves. Later on Wilson comes back and climbs through House's kitchen window. Wilson is concerned that House may be throwing away a drug free year. House tells him that the reason why he is ignoring him is because he is spending time with his girlfriend, Cuddy. Wilson doesn't buy it and thinks that House is back on Vicodin. He is then convinced that House is not back on it after checking his blood pressure and pupils. After spending the day together, House tells Cuddy that he knows that the relationship is not going to work. Nevertheless, at the end he tells her for the first time that he loves her and Cuddy eventually leaves.

Meanwhile, Dr. Richardson (George Wyner), the hospital's neurosurgeon, goes home with severe nausea. Without a neurosurgeon on site, the hospital's accreditation as a Level 1 Trauma Center is threatened. House doesn't want Cuddy to know that Dr. Richardson is sick because that means they won't get to spend the day off with each other, so he calls Chase to take care of it. Chase and Thirteen treat him for food poisoning, knowing the medicine they gave Dr. Richardson could have some serious side-effects. Indeed, after the medicine Dr. Richardson finds everything shiny and keeps undressing, running around the hospital. The team thinks these are side effects of the medication and wait for him to come down from the high. However, he doesn't appear to start coming down when he should, and the team then count in these as symptoms along with severe nausea. Dr. Richardson admits to having gone to a seafood festival once, and admits to having eaten roe. Thirteen realizes toad eggs can cause nausea and get a person high. The antidote is fast-acting, and Dr. Richardson soon passes as a functioning neurosurgeon.

While this is taking place, the team discovers that Thirteen has plans to travel to Rome for a Huntington's trial. At the end of the episode, it is revealed that Foreman called the hospital in Rome, who informed him they had never heard of Thirteen. However, by the time he discovered this, she had already left the hospital and disconnected her phone.

Reception

Critical response 
The AV Club gave the episode B+.

Ratings 
This episode was watched by 10.54 million American viewers 
In Canada, the episode was watched by 2.70 million viewers, placing second for the week behind the fourth season premiere of The Big Bang Theory, which was watched by 3.11 million viewers.

Production  
"Now What?" debuted new opening credits. The following full-time cast members are retained:
 Hugh Laurie
 Lisa Edelstein
 Omar Epps
 Robert Sean Leonard
 Jesse Spencer
 Peter Jacobson
 Olivia Wilde

Jennifer Morrison no longer appears.

References

External links
 

House (season 7) episodes
2010 American television episodes